Constancio Ramiro Mayor Ruiz (born 9 May 1991) is a Spanish professional footballer who plays for Unionistas de Salamanca CF as a central defender.

Club career
Ramiro was born in Zaragoza, Aragon. A product of Real Zaragoza's youth ranks, he made his first-team debut on 13 December 2011 in a 1–1 away draw against AD Alcorcón for the campaign's Copa del Rey. He spent the vast majority of his spell with the Aragonese with the reserve team, playing one season in Tercera División and another in Segunda División B.

On 7 July 2012, Ramiro signed with another club in the third level, Villarreal CF B. In January of the following year, he left for fellow league side Zamora CF.

On 9 July 2014, Ramiro moved to another reserve team, Real Valladolid B also in the third division. On 16 June of the following year he joined Alcorcón from Segunda División, being loaned to CD Guijuelo on 20 August.

Gimnástica Torrelavega announced on 2 January 2019, that they had signed Mayor.

References

External links

1991 births
Living people
Footballers from Zaragoza
Spanish footballers
Association football defenders
Segunda División B players
Tercera División players
Real Zaragoza B players
Real Zaragoza players
Villarreal CF B players
Zamora CF footballers
Real Valladolid Promesas players
AD Alcorcón footballers
CD Guijuelo footballers
Burgos CF footballers
UD Logroñés players
Gimnástica de Torrelavega footballers
UP Langreo footballers
Unionistas de Salamanca CF players
Spain youth international footballers